Magnus Warming  (born 8 June 2000) is a Danish professional footballer who plays as a forward or winger for German  club Darmstadt on loan from Torino in Serie A.

Club career

Brøndby
Warming joined Brøndby IF from Nykøbing FC in June 2015 at the age of 15.

Magnus Warming made his Brøndby IF debut at the age of 16 years and 348 days as the youngest player ever in the club history when he was brought on for the final ten minutes in the 3–0 away defeat against SønderjyskE on 21 May 2017. This feat has since been outdone by Morten Frendrup, who made his debut at age 16 and 310 days in 2018.

On 11 January 2019, Warming returned to Nykøbing FC on loan for the rest of 2019. Warming played nine league games and scored one goal for Nykøbing in the 2018–19 season. He returned to Brøndby and was training with the club in the first few weeks of the 2019–20 pre-season, before returned to Nykøbing in July to complete his loan deal.

Lyngby
On 7 January 2020, Warming was signed by Lyngby Boldklub. He impressed on multiple occasions, scoring decisive goals during the second half of the 2020–21 season especially. He suffered relegation to the Danish 1st Division with the club on 9 May 2021 after a loss to last placed AC Horsens. On 12 May 2021, it was announced that Warming had turned down a transfer offer from defending Norwegian champions Bodø/Glimt.

Torino
On 9 July 2021, it was announced that Warming had signed a three-year contract with Serie A club Torino. He made his debut on 17 October in the 1–0 away loss to Napoli, coming on as a late substitute for Ben Lhassine Kone.

Loan to Darmstadt
On 15 June 2022, Warming joined Darmstadt in Germany on loan with an option to buy. He made his league debut with the club on 16 July, in a 2–0 away defeat against Jahn Regensburg. On 1 August, he scored his first goal for Darmstadt in a 3–0 away win against FC Ingolstadt in the DFB-Pokal.

Career statistics

References

External links
 Magnus Warming on DBU 

2000 births
Living people
People from Guldborgsund Municipality
Association football forwards
Association football wingers
Danish men's footballers
Danish expatriate men's footballers
Denmark youth international footballers
Denmark under-21 international footballers
Danish Superliga players
Danish 1st Division players
Serie A players
2. Bundesliga players
Brøndby IF players
Nykøbing FC players
Lyngby Boldklub players
Torino F.C. players
SV Darmstadt 98 players
Expatriate footballers in Italy
Danish expatriate sportspeople in Italy
Expatriate footballers in Germany
Danish expatriate sportspeople in Germany
Sportspeople from Region Zealand